Leptosiphon filipes (syn. Linanthus filipes) is a species of flowering plant in the phlox family known by the common name thread linanthus.

Distribution
It is endemic to California, primarily in the foothills of the western Sierra Nevada, and also the Inner Northern California Coast Ranges. It is found below , in oak woodland, grassland, and Yellow pine forest habitats.

Description
Leptosiphon filipes is a petite annual herb producing a threadlike stem up to 20 centimeters long. The oppositely arranged leaves are each divided into linear lobes just a few millimeters long.

The inflorescence at the tip of the stem is generally composed of a single tiny flower a few millimeters wide. It is pink or white with a yellow throat. The bloom period is April to July.

External links
 Calflora Database: Leptosiphon filipes (Thread linanthus)
Jepson Manual eFlora (TJM2) treatment of Leptosiphon filipes
UC CalPhotos gallery: Leptosiphon filipes

filipes
Endemic flora of California
Flora of the Sierra Nevada (United States)
Natural history of the California chaparral and woodlands
Natural history of the California Coast Ranges
Flora without expected TNC conservation status